From August 16 to August 19, 1976, voters of the Republican Party chose its nominee for president in the 1976 United States presidential election. The major candidates were incumbent President Gerald Ford and former Governor of California Ronald Reagan. After a series of primary elections and caucuses, neither secured a majority of the delegates before the convention.

The 1976 election marks the first time that Republican primaries or caucuses were held in every state and D.C.; the Democrats had done so in 1972. It was also the last election in which the Republican nominee was undetermined at the start of the party's national convention.

Background

August 1974 – February 1975: The Ford presidency begins
Following the Watergate scandal and resignation of President Richard Nixon, Vice President Gerald Ford was elevated to president on August 9, 1974. Because Ford had been appointed vice president by Nixon following the resignation of Spiro Agnew from the position, he became the only president inaugurated without having been previously voted into either the presidential or vice presidential office by the Electoral College.

On September 8, Ford's first major act in office was to grant a full and unconditional pardon for any crimes Richard Nixon might have committed against the United States while President. Following his pardon of Nixon, Ford's approval ratings among the American public dropped precipitously. Within a week, his approval rating fell from 69% to 49%, the steepest decline in history.

The economy was in dire condition upon Ford's elevation, marked by the worst peacetime inflation in American history and the highest interest rates in a century. The Dow Jones had declined 43 percent from October 1973 to September 1974. To combat inflation, Ford first proposed a tax increase and later, in response to Democratic calls for a permanent cut in taxes, a temporary moderate decrease. Reagan publicly criticized both proposals. 

Race and education divided public opinion, especially over issues such as forced integration and changes to public school curriculum. Political violence over education policy broke out in Boston and Charleston, West Virginia. Abortion also became a nationally salient issue after the Supreme Court's Roe v. Wade decision, which was announced two days after Nixon's resignation and struck down state restrictions on abortion nationwide.

In the 1974 midterm elections, the Democratic Party dramatically expanded its majorities in both the House and Senate. The elections were seen as a referendum on the Republican Party post-Watergate and on the political establishment more generally. Newly elected members of Congress became known as "Watergate Babies" and aggressively pursued procedural and oversight reforms.

During this period, Ronald Reagan concluded his second term in office as Governor of California. His administration was marked by efforts to dismantle the welfare state and a high-profile crackdown on urban crime and left-wing dissent, especially at the University of California, Berkeley. He also led an effort to enforce the state's capital punishment laws but was blocked by the California Supreme Court in the People v. Anderson decision. Following Reagan's retirement from office in January 1975, he began hosting a national radio show and writing a national newspaper column.

March–July 1975: Conservatives revolt and Reagan rises
Conservative opposition to Ford within the Republican Party began to surface in December 1974, following his appointment of New York Governor Nelson Rockefeller as vice president. For more than a decade, Rockefeller had represented the party's liberal establishment, and the appointment faced immediate criticism from right-wing senators like Jesse Helms, Barry Goldwater and John Tower, though Rockefeller's confirmation in the Senate was largely undeterred.

Discontent reached a fever pitch at the second annual Conservative Political Action Conference in February. Speaking there, Reagan dismissed calls to seek the presidency on a third-party ticket: "Is it a third party that we need, or is it a new and revitalized second party, raising a banner of no pale pastels, but bold colors which could make it unmistakably clear where we stand on all the issues troubling the people?" Speakers at CPAC also criticized Ford administration policy, Vice President Rockefeller, and First Lady Betty Ford's public campaign in support of abortion and the Equal Rights Amendment. In March, discussion began to build around Reagan's presidential prospects following an appearance on The Tonight Show and a profile in Newsweek that called him, "the most kinetic single presence in American political life." In defense, the administration drafted a letter of support for President Ford that received the signatures of 113 of 145 GOP Representatives and 31 of 38 Senators. Ford formally announced he would run for reelection on July 8.

More than any domestic issue in 1975, foreign policy drove a wedge between the President and his conservative critics. Following the American evacuation of Saigon and the collapse of South Vietnam, these criticisms grew vociferous. On his radio show, Reagan compared the withdrawal from Saigon to the Munich Agreement and warned that it would "tempt the Soviet Union as it once tempted Hitler and the military rulers of Japan." While Ford regained some support from conservatives following the rescue of the SS Mayaguez in Cambodia, he soon drew the ire of the party's right wing with a series of foreign policy moves designed to improve relations with the Soviet Union. 

First, President Ford refused to meet with Soviet dissident Aleksandr Solzhenitsyn on his visit to the United States on June 21. In response, Reagan publicly criticized Ford by name for the first time in his national newspaper column, contrasting the popular Solzhenitsyn to other "guests the President had entertained in the White House, "the Strawberry Queen of West Virginia and the Maid of Cotton." The day after this column ran, Senator Paul Laxalt announced the formation of a committee named "Friends of Ronald Reagan," organized for the purpose of drafting Reagan to run for president.

Ford followed the Solzhenitsyn affair with an overseas trip to Eastern Europe, where he signed the Helsinki Accords, a treaty establishing that the current boundaries of Eastern European nations were "inviolable by force." Conservatives and anti-communists harshly criticized Ford for capitulating to Soviet demands and formally recognizing the Eastern bloc. The Wall Street Journal called the Helsinki agreement the "new Yalta." By late August, Ford's approval rating was polled at 34%.

On September 5 in Sacramento, Ford survived the first of two attempts on his life by lone assassins. A second attempt followed on September 21. Neither assassin struck Ford.

September–December 1975: Reagan enters the race 
In September, Reagan began to actively campaign in key early states. He stumped in New Hampshire for Louis Wyman in the special election for Senate and began to assemble a campaign staff led by campaign manager John Sears. He secured the endorsement of New Hampshire's conservative governor Meldrim Thomson Jr. and state party chairman, as well as support from moderate former governor Hugh Gregg.

On November 4, Vice President Nelson Rockefeller announced he would not seek nomination as Ford's running mate in 1976. That same day, Ford fired Secretary of Defense James R. Schlesinger, whose critical comments on the Helsinki summit had been leaked to the press earlier in the fall. That week, Ford traveled to Massachusetts and pledged to campaign in every primary in the nation. 

On November 20, Ronald Reagan officially announced his campaign for president.

Campaign 

Ford narrowly defeated Reagan in the New Hampshire primary, and then won the Florida and Illinois primaries by comfortable margins. During the first six contests, Reagan followed the "eleventh commandment" he used during his initial campaign for governor of California: "Thou shalt not speak ill of any fellow Republican." By the North Carolina primary, Reagan's campaign was nearly out of money, and it was widely believed that another defeat would force him to quit the race. But with the help of U.S. Senator Jesse Helms's powerful political organization, Reagan upset Ford. Reagan had abandoned the approach of invoking the commandment and beat Ford 52% to 46%, regaining momentum.

Reagan then had a string of impressive victories, including Texas, where he won all delegates at stake in its first binding primary. Four other delegates chosen at the Texas state convention went to Reagan and the state shut out its U.S. senator, John G. Tower, who had been named to manage the Ford campaign on the convention floor. Ford bounced back to win his home state of Michigan, and from there, the two candidates engaged in an increasingly bitter nip-and-tuck contest for delegates. By the time the party's convention opened in August 1976, the race was still too close to call.

Reagan was the first candidate to win a presidential primary against an incumbent actively running for reelection since Estes Kefauver defeated Harry Truman in the 1952 New Hampshire primary. Former Texas governor John Connally speculated that Reagan's attacks weakened Ford in the general election against his opponent and eventual successor, Jimmy Carter.

Schedule and results

Candidates 
This was the last time during the 20th century (and the last time to date) that a primary season had ended without a presumptive nominee.

Candidates who declined to run 

Senator Howard Baker of Tennessee
Senator Edward Brooke of Massachusetts
Senator James L. Buckley of New York
Representative John Conlan of Arizona
Former Secretary of the Treasury John Connally of Texas
Senator Charles Mathias of Maryland
Senator Charles Percy of Illinois
Ambassador Elliot Richardson of Massachusetts
Vice President Nelson Rockefeller of New York
 Former Vice President Spiro Agnew of Maryland

Polling

National polling

Before August 1974

August 1974–December 1975

Head-to-head polling

Convention

The 1976 Republican National Convention was held in Kansas City. As the convention began, Ford was seen as having a slight lead in delegate votes, but fewer than the 1,130 he needed to win. Reagan and Ford competed for the votes of individual delegates and state delegations. In a bid to woo moderate Northern Republicans, Reagan shocked the convention by announcing that if he won the nomination, Senator Richard Schweiker of Pennsylvania, from the northern liberal wing of the party, would be his running mate. The move backfired, however, as few moderates switched to Reagan while many conservative delegates were outraged. The key state of Mississippi, which Reagan needed, narrowly voted for Ford; it was believed that Reagan's choice of Schweiker led Clarke Reed, Mississippi's chairman, to switch to Ford. Ford then narrowly won the nomination on the first ballot. He chose Senator Robert Dole of Kansas as his running mate. After giving his acceptance speech, Ford asked Reagan to say a few words to the convention.

Results 

Convention tally:

President Ford 1187
Ronald Reagan 1070
Elliot L. Richardson 1

Vice-presidential nomination

Ford chose Senator Robert J. Dole of Kansas as his running mate, while Reagan chose Pennsylvania Senator Richard Schweiker.

See also
1976 Democratic Party presidential primaries

References